The DeJong House is a historic one-and-a-half-story house in Utica, South Dakota. It was built in 1905 as an "L-shaped gable structure with clapboard facing and two single stack chimneys." It has been listed on the National Register of Historic Places since April 16, 1980.

References

National Register of Historic Places in Yankton County, South Dakota
Houses completed in 1905
1905 establishments in South Dakota